William Erby Beall (January 24, 1922 – November 2, 2013) was an American football coach and college athletics administrator.  He served as the head coach at Baylor University from 1969 to 1971, compiling a record of 3–28.  A native of Osceola, Arkansas, Beall graduated from Memphis State College, now the University of Memphis, in 1950.

Head coaching record

College

References

External links
 Bill Beall's obituary

1922 births
2013 deaths
American football halfbacks
Arkansas State Red Wolves football coaches
Arkansas State Red Wolves football players
Baylor Bears football coaches
Louisiana–Monroe Warhawks athletic directors
LSU Tigers football coaches
Rice Owls football coaches
High school football coaches in Arkansas
University of Memphis alumni
People from Osceola, Arkansas
Players of American football from Arkansas